Tair Kaminer is an Israeli citizen who in 2016 as a teenager refused to pass the military service, when she went with her parents to a military base for registration.

The event
When Kaminer went with her parents to register for military service, she refused. So she was known as a convict and became a prisoner for 28 days.

She objected to the occupation of Palestine and the town construction, saying, “I'm not going to break... I hope they understand that - I won't break.” She added “I saw the effect of war on children and adults,” she said, describing the injuries caused by rocket attacks from Gaza and the evolving “generations of hate” on both sides.
As the The Independent mentioned, she stated because of her voluntary contributions to children who were injured in the Israel-Gaza conflict, she cannot perform this kind of service at the military, but she agreed to perform an alternative service.

Tair Kaminer was not the only person who refused to pass the military service. Tanya Golan is another 19-year-old girl who refused to pass military service in the Israeli military.

On Sunday, 31 January Tair Kaminer was reverted to training military centre in Tel-Hashomer.

Feed back
According to The Independent, the goal of Tair Kaminer for refusal is the reformation of laws punishing conscientious objectors, but she has been known as a traitor.

The ordered demonstrations have been held out of her prison and the training bases for soldiers by objectors.

The Green Party MP stated to Brighton Pavilion : “With tensions high in Israel, this is a particularly difficult time to be a conscientious objector … (we call) on the Government to request the Israeli authorities to accept the conscientious objection of Israeli citizens who do not wish to bear arms against a civilian population under military occupation.” when this statement was mentioned at the Houses of Parliament, Amnesty International Israel controverted it. Some parties confirmed this statement like Labour,  Scottish National Party, the Conservatives and Plaid Cymru for the legal impunity for demurrer of Israeli's military service such as Tair Kaminer.

See also
Israeli–Palestinian conflict

References

External links
 The letter of Tair Kaminer, January 2016

Date of birth missing (living people)
Living people
Israeli conscientious objectors
Israeli prisoners and detainees
People from Sderot
Year of birth missing (living people)